Patellaria is a genus of fungi in the family Patellariaceae. The genus was circumscribed in 1822 by mycologist Elias Magnus Fries with Patellaria atrata assigned as the type species.

Species
, Species Fungorum accepts 46 species of Patellaria.
Patellaria abbotiana 
Patellaria aberrans 
Patellaria albiziae 
Patellaria americana 
Patellaria apiculatae 
Patellaria argyrioides 
Patellaria atrata 
Patellaria atratula 
Patellaria atroalba 
Patellaria bacillifera 
Patellaria berberidis 
Patellaria caesalpiniae 
Patellaria californica 
Patellaria callispora 
Patellaria chromolaenae  – Thailand
Patellaria combreti 
Patellaria compressa 
Patellaria desertorum 
Patellaria euphorbiae 
Patellaria eximia 
Patellaria finkii 
Patellaria fusca 
Patellaria glycosmidis 
Patellaria gregaria 
Patellaria henningsii 
Patellaria ipomoeae 
Patellaria jamaicensis 
Patellaria lantanae 
Patellaria lasiosiphonis 
Patellaria lathyri 
Patellaria maura 
Patellaria myrticola 
Patellaria peckii 
Patellaria pumilio 
Patellaria purpurea 
Patellaria quercina 
Patellaria quercus 
Patellaria schwarzmanniana 
Patellaria scutellaris 
Patellaria similis 
Patellaria stirtonii 
Patellaria subacerina 
Patellaria subatrata 
Patellaria submacrospora 
Patellaria subrotuliformis 
Patellaria tetraspora

References

Dothideomycetes
Dothideomycetes genera
Taxa described in 1822
Taxa named by Elias Magnus Fries